Carter W. Clarke (September 20, 1896 – September 3, 1987) was a US Army intelligence officer and brigadier general who was the military intelligence officer who prepared intercepted Japanese Magic cables for US officials. He also headed a War Department investigation into the role that military intelligence before the Japanese attack on Pearl Harbor.

Clarke joined the army in 1916, the year prior to US entry into World War I. In his work for the Military Intelligence Division, he was instrumental in 1943 in starting the Venona project. In 1944, he ignored a request initiated by Eleanor Roosevelt to cease the project.

During the Korean War, he commanded forces in Osaka, Japan. Late in his career, he also worked as an assistant to Allen W. Dulles, who was Director of Central Intelligence. Clarke retired in 1954.

In a 1959 interview, Clarke said that he disagreed with the decision to drop atomic bombings on Japan at the end of World War II and believed it had been unnecessary since Japan was "down to an abject surrender through the accelerated sinking of their merchant marine and hunger alone, and when we didn't need to do it, and we knew we didn't need to do it, and they knew we knew we didn't need to do it, we used them as an experiment for two atomic bombs."

Clarke died of a heart attack at his home in Clearwater, Florida.

Personal life
General Clarke was married to Jessie Clarke and had a son, Carter Clarke Jr. (born c. 1928), and two grandchildren. Carter Clarke Jr. is a retired United States Army brigadier general who in 1996 founded Gemesis Corporation, the largest manufacturer of gem-quality synthetic diamonds. Clarke died on September 3, 1987 in Clearwater, Florida at the age of 90 from a heart attack.

References

External links
Generals of World War II

United States Army generals
United States Army personnel of World War I
United States Army personnel of the Korean War
1987 deaths
1896 births
United States Army generals of World War II
United States Army Command and General Staff College alumni
United States Army War College alumni
Burials at Arlington National Cemetery